Bruce Barrymore Halpenny (1937 – 3 May 2015) was an English military historian and author, specializing in airfields and aircraft, as well as ghost stories and mysteries. He was also a broadcaster and games inventor.

Parents
Halpenny's father was a Canadian First World War soldier who fought at Vimy Ridge, and his mother was a British First World War munitions worker from Lincolnshire. Bruce is from Lincolnshire, England.

Military career
Halpenny served in the Royal Air Force Police (RAFP) in specialist units, often overseas. After being wounded, he moved across to the RAF Police on Special Security Duties (Atomic & Chemical Weapons), and was part of a special RAF military police unit on Special Duties and in the Nuclear Division, responsible for protecting the nuclear weapons used by the V bombers in times of war.

Literary career
In the 1950s whilst in the Royal Air Force, he was wounded and had to undergo several operations, in which his life was in the balance as dedicated surgeons fought to not only save his hand and arm, but also his life.  In rehabilitation, he started writing and research as a hobby, and though he stayed in the RAF and was to serve on Special Duties and in the Nuclear Division, his hobby turned into a profession in later years after leaving the forces.

Early years
In the early period of his writing career, he started out by writing love stories and cowboy stories for the American market under pen names.  Then, because of his specialist knowledge of the Royal Air Force, he focused on military history, especially RAF history of World War Two, often with deep insights, facts and personal human interest stories.  At one time, he was writing articles for up to 14 military journals around the world, when he was approached by the publishers Patrick Stephens to do the Airfield books due to his vast knowledge and authority.

Military history
When he researched the British RAF airfield histories, particularly those of London, Yorkshire and Lincolnshire, Halpenny found that public records held very little, if any, information at all, so he had to do all the research himself going back to the very beginning. This helped to unearth a rich source of information, which others have since used, but set Halpenny as an undisputed RAF expert. For his research on the airfields, Halpenny interviewed 1,400 people, researched records and letters, and travelled thousands of miles. Halpenny visited each and every airfield, (some of which he had prior knowledge of from his military days), to ensure accuracy.

His books quickly became essential reference books for all aviation historians. Virtually all of the information was new, in the sense that it hadn't appeared in the dozens of books which had been written about the RAF, new too were the many photographs that were just a selection of the thousands he collected and commissioned. In the opening chapters of his book Action Stations 2 Wartime Military Airfields of Lincolnshire and the East Midlands, there were a selection of control tower photos – this was the first time this had been done in any book.

He also wrote various military themed books from such as English Electrical/BAC Lightning to Wartime Poems. He specialized in the British jets, English Electric Lightning, English Electric Canberra and Avro Vulcan.

Ghosts and mysteries
Halpenny had been writing ghost stories in the 1960s, and encountering ghost stories in his exhaustive research into airfield histories, when in 1984 he decided they should form the subject of a special book, and so started to add to, and research his 'ghost-mystery' files about abandoned airfields that murmur and whisper with ghosts. By 1984, he had become acknowledged as not only a respected British military historian, expert in airfield histories, but also the expert in RAF Ghosts, especially surrounding airfields. Ghost Stations was born, and in 1986 the first book was published, and proved a best seller as it recounts how "headless airmen and other spectres have appeared in control towers and other Service buildings throughout the country". Such was demand that a second book entitled, Aaargh! was published with over 30 stories, one of which was The eerie mystery of Lightning 894. Aaargh!, was later to become Ghost Stations 2, as more books later followed over the years, and became the cult series of Ghost Stations books.

Halpenny's unique knowledge and position meant that he was also known for accessing and finding information generally closed to the general public and media, especially Ministry of Defence (MoD) material concerning UFOs.

Halpenny always maintained that all airfields are haunted. Over the years, he uncovered a wealth of material about ghostly experiences on wartime airfields.  "The evidence of ghosts keeps popping up and is so rich that it cannot be ignored," he said continuing, "You have to remember that 55,000 men of Bomber Command died while operating from Britain in World War Two, and almost all of them met a violent end, so it isn't surprising that dozens of earthbound spirits have been left behind."

Games inventor
Halpenny was also a games inventor, and created The Great Train Robbery board game in the 1970s.  It was used as a prize on shows such as Tiswas and Crackerjack.

Charities, causes and animal rights
Halpenny was always vocal in his campaigns for numerous organizations and causes, especially concerning veterans, war widows, wounded and invalided servicemen and women. He also helped schools and children's charities such as Mencap, in campaigning and highlighting issues, and even in one case when he donated a vintage bottle of wine to help raise funds. The bottle was unique in that it was the last bottle remaining after the Nazis had plundered the cellars of families living in an Italian Abruzzo village in World War II. The author's uncle was a Canadian tank commander whose tank was the first to liberate the village, and was also the first tank to enter Ortona in the Battle of Ortona.  The bottle was given to the author, as he lived in Abruzzo and his research work had taken him to that area. Halpenny said on donating the bottle:

He also long campaigned for the Government to do their part and preserve a 1939-45 War airfield in its original condition; to let future generations see how the RAF operated during those dark days.

He was a long-term supporter for animal welfare, especially dogs and wolves, and was the president of the Wolf Preservation Foundation.

Family

Bruce and his wife, equestrian writer and horsewoman, Marion Rose Halpenny, have a son, Baron Barrymore Halpenny, a commercial artist.

Books

Ghost Stations (book series) 1986–2012

References

External links
Bruce Barrymore Halpenny's website
Review of Fighter Pilots in World War II at Roll-of-Honour.com
Imperial War Museum use of Reference Books
Airmuseum Canada

1937 births
2015 deaths
English military writers
English military historians
English male novelists
English writers on paranormal topics
Historians of World War II
People from Caistor
People from Abruzzo
20th-century Royal Air Force personnel
Air force historians
Historians of aviation
Aviation writers
Ufologists
UFO conspiracy theorists
UFO writers
Fortean writers
Board game designers
People educated at De Aston School
English people of Canadian descent
English conspiracy theorists